Greville or Gréville may refer to:

Places

Gréville-Hague, in the Manche département, France
Port Greville, Nova Scotia, Canada

People

First name
Greville Janner (1928–2015), British Labour Party politician and alleged child abuser
Greville Wynne (1919–1990) British businessman and spy for Soviets

Surname

Algernon Greville (1798–1864), amateur cricketer
Charles Greville (disambiguation)
Charles Cavendish Fulke Greville (1794–1865), English diarist and amateur cricketer 
Charles Francis Greville (1749–1809), British antiquarian, collector and politician
Edmond T. Gréville (1906–1966), French film director and screenwriter
Frances Greville (1724–1789), Irish poet and celebrity
Fulke Greville, 1st Baron Brooke (1554–1628), English poet, dramatist, and statesman
Handel Greville (1921–2014), Wales rugby international player
Henry Gréville (1842–1902), French writer
John Rodger Greville (1834–1894), Irish-born comic actor in Australia
Julia Greville (born 1979), Australian Olympic freestyle swimmer
Margaret Greville (1863–1942), British society host and philanthropist
Robert Greville, 2nd Baron Brooke (1607–1643), English Puritan activist
Robert Fulke Greville (1751–1824), British Army officer and politician
Robert Kaye Greville (1794–1866), Scottish botanist, illustrator
Thomas N. E. Greville (1910–1998), American statistician of psychic research

See also
Fulke Greville (disambiguation)